Tuoyuan Subdistrict is a subdistrict and the seat of local government of Hecheng District in Huaihua Prefecturel-level City, Hunan, China. Merging the former Shimen Township to it,  the subdistrict was reformed on November 25, 2015.

References

Hecheng District
Subdistricts of Hunan
County seats in Hunan